Adam Mars-Jones (born 26 October 1954) is a British novelist and literary and film critic.

Early life and education
Mars-Jones was born in London, to Sir William Mars-Jones (1915–1999), a Welsh High Court judge and a President of the London Welsh Trust, and Sheila Mary Felicity (1923–1999), an attorney, daughter of Charles Cobon, a marine engineer. Mars-Jones studied at Westminster School, and read Classics at Trinity Hall, Cambridge.

Career
Mars-Jones is a regular contributor to The Guardian, The Observer, The Times Literary Supplement, and the London Review of Books. He also participated in BBC Television's Newsnight Review.

His first collection of stories, Lantern Lecture (1981), won a Somerset Maugham Award. Other works include Monopolies of Loss (1992) and  The Darker Proof: Stories from a Crisis (1987), which was co-written with Edmund White. His first novel, The Waters of Thirst, was published in 1993. His essay "Venus Envy", a polemic against Martin Amis, was originally published in the CounterBlasts series in 1990. Pilcrow (2008) was his second novel, followed by Cedilla in 2011. These two works form the first two parts of a projected trilogy.

He was elected a Fellow of the Royal Society of Literature in 2007.

Noriko Smiling, a book concerning the Yasujirō Ozu-directed film Late Spring, was published in 2011.

In 2012, he was awarded the inaugural Hatchet Job of the Year Award for his review of Michael Cunningham's By Nightfall.

On 2 January 2015, Mars-Jones was captain of the winning team on Christmas University Challenge, representing Trinity Hall, Cambridge, who defeated Balliol College, Oxford, the University of Edinburgh and the University of Hull. His teammates were international rower Tom James, world champion cyclist Emma Pooley and actor Dan Starkey.

Personal life
His 1997 "Blind Bitter Happiness" re-tells the difficult life of his mother and his relationship to her. Mars-Jones' 2015 memoir of his father "Kid Gloves" deals with his father's struggle to come to terms with his son's homosexuality and his father's later slide into dementia in old age.

Bibliography

References

External links
 Featured in the opening literary event of the Pride London Festival Fortnight on 22 June 2009 at Foyles bookshop.
 

1954 births
Living people
British male journalists
20th-century British novelists
21st-century British novelists
The Guardian journalists
People educated at Westminster School, London
Writers from London
The Times people
Alumni of Trinity Hall, Cambridge
Fellows of the Royal Society of Literature
British male novelists
British gay writers
British LGBT broadcasters
English LGBT writers
20th-century English male writers
21st-century English male writers
21st-century LGBT people